Aphomia erumpens is a species of snout moth in the genus Aphomia. It was described by Thomas Pennington Lucas in 1898 and is known from Queensland, Australia.

References

Moths described in 1898
Tirathabini
Moths of Australia